Phenoxathiin (dibenzooxathiane) C12H8OS is a heterocyclic compound of molecular weight 200.25632 g/mol with the CAS Registry Number 262-20-4.

Diphenyl ether is a starting material in the production of phenoxathiin via the Ferrario reaction. Phenoxathiin is used in polyamide and polyimide production.

References

External links
 Chemicalbook.com
 Webbook.nist.gov

Sulfur heterocycles
Nitrogen heterocycles
Heterocyclic compounds with 3 rings